James C. Hanson (July 11, 1862 – February 1, 1946) was a farmer and insurance executive who served as a member of the Wisconsin State Assembly.

Background and work 
Hanson was born at Slysrup on the island of Lolland, Denmark on July 11, 1862. His family left Denmark for Christiana, Dane County, Wisconsin when he was a child; his father, a brother, and a sister all died during a cholera epidemic during the voyage. He went to Albion Academy and Milton College.

Later, he lived in Deerfield, Wisconsin. He was a farmer, and active in the cooperative movement. He also worked as a director of the Albion Insurance Company, retiring after fifty years in March 1943.

Legislative career and after 
Hanson was a member of the Assembly from 1917 to 1940. He was a member of the Republican Party and the Wisconsin Progressive Party.

He died of a heart attack at his daughter's home in Christiana in 1946.

References

External links

The Political Graveyard

People from Lolland
Danish emigrants to the United States
People from Christiana, Dane County, Wisconsin
Milton College alumni
Republican Party members of the Wisconsin State Assembly
Wisconsin Progressives (1924)
20th-century American politicians
1862 births
1946 deaths
People from Deerfield, Wisconsin